Dorking Rugby Football Club is an English rugby union football club, originally based in Dorking, Surrey and play in the nearby village of Brockham. The club currently play in the fourth tier (National League 2 East) of English club rugby.

About
With over 700 active registered players, the club runs four senior sides and is a home-club to many internationals such as Elliot Daly, George Kruis, and Kay Wilson; a ladies team, and a large youth section aged between 5 and 18.

History
Dorking RFC was founded in 1921 with a single team; a second team followed in 1928. The club ceased to play in 1940 due to the demands of World War II.  It was re-established in 1946, initially with a single team, but grew rapidly as 2nd (1947), 3rd (1948) and 4th (1954) teams were formed.

The club moved to The Big Field in Brockham in 1972 when it was granted a 50-year lease by the National Trust. This was extended with another 50-year lease in 2011.

The first youth team – Dorking Schoolboys XV – was formed in 1951 with a single team of 13- to 18-year-olds. By 1965 this had grown to the point of splitting into three age banded teams. A mini section (for girls and boys aged 6–12) followed in 1980 and the first ladies team in 1988. Dorking youth teams have twice triumphed in the National under-17 cup, winning the main competition in 2007 and the Shield in 2012.

The 1st XV was promoted to the RFU National Leagues (National League 3 London & SE) in 2009 and at the end of the 2013–14 season won promotion to National League 2 South, finishing fourth in 2014–15, their highest league position to date. However the 2015–16 season saw the club lose many players such as hooker Ross Grimstone to Richmond F.C. & scrum half Will Crow to Rosslyn Park F.C. who represented the England Counties side in a game against Romania in the summer prior to the end of 2014–15.

Current standings

John Douglas Youth Development Fund
The official launch of the John Douglas Youth Development Fund took place on Wednesday 15 March 2017. Joined by members of John's family and his former colleagues from Surrey RFU, it was a fitting tribute to a man who gave so much to DRFC and the wider rugby community over many years and whose enormous passion for the sport has benefited so many of our players. The primary aim of the JDYDF is to "fund or part fund specific projects or initiatives in the support of obtaining the highest possible standard and engagement of rugby through Dorking Rugby Club with particular emphasis on Youth Development".

Honours
 Surrey 1 champions: 1988–89
 London 3 South West champions: 1989–90
 London 2 South champions: 1990–91
 London Division 4 South West champions: 2005–06
 London 2 (south-east v south-west) promotion play-off winners: 2006–07
 Powergen Junior Vase: 2006
 London 1 (north v south) promotion play-off winners: 2008–09
 Surrey Cup winners (3): 2010, 2014, 2017
 National League 3 London & SE champions: 2013–14

References

External links
 Official club website

English rugby union teams
Rugby clubs established in 1921
Rugby union clubs in Surrey